Powys is a county in Wales.

Powys may also refer to:

 Kingdom of Powys, a medieval kingdom in what is now Wales and England
 Powys (surname)
 Powys Thomas (1925–1977), British-born actor

See also
 Powis (disambiguation)